Dublin Zoo, in Phoenix Park, Dublin, is a zoo in Ireland, and one of Dublin's most popular attractions. Established and designed in 1830 by Decimus Burton, it opened the following year. Today it focuses on conservation projects, breeding programmes, and growing awareness for animals. Its stated mission is to "work in partnership with zoos worldwide to make a significant contribution to the conservation of the endangered species on Earth".

Overall the zoo houses about 400 animals across 100 species and attracts over one million visitors each year.

History

19th century

The Royal Zoological Society of Dublin was established at a meeting held at the Rotunda Hospital on 10 May 1830 and the zoo, then called the Zoological Gardens Dublin, was opened to the public on 1 September 1831. The animals, 46 mammals and 72 birds, were donated by London Zoo and Royal Menagerie of the Tower of London. Initially, the entrance fee was one shilling. What made Dublin Zoo very different from some of its contemporaries was a decision to reduce the charge to one penny on Sundays. This choice made the Zoo popular among the less wealthy.

In 1833, the original cottage-style entrance lodge to the zoo was built at a cost of £30. The thatch-roofed building is still visible to the right of the current entrance. In 1838, to celebrate Queen Victoria's coronation, the zoo held an open day – 20,000 people visited, which is still the highest number of visitors in one day. President of the United States Ulysses S. Grant (after leaving office) was among the celebrities who came to see Dublin's world-famous lions in the 19th century. The first tearooms were built in 1898.

In 1844 the zoo received its first giraffe, and in 1855 it bought its first pair of lions. These bred for the first time in 1857. Reptiles got their own house in 1876.

20th century
 Christopher's son Jack stayed in the zoo during the 1916 Easter Rising to care for the animals with two other young keepers, dealing with food shortages for the animals amongst other problems. He died shortly after from the Spanish flu in his twenties.

On 17 June 1903 an elephant named Sita killed her keeper while he nursed her injured foot. She was put down by members of the Royal Irish Constabulary. Times of trouble and war also caused problems for the zoo. Meat ran out during the Easter Rising of 1916. In order to keep the lions and tigers alive, some of the other animals in the zoo were killed. A lion named Slats was born in the zoo on 20 March 1919. According to Dublin Zoo: An Illustrated History by Catherine De Courcy it was one of many lions filmed by the Metro-Goldwyn-Mayer film studio in 1928 to be used as their mascot Leo.

Between 1989 and 1990 the financial situation at the zoo became so serious that the council considered closing it. The Government then gave it a meaningful annual grant in line with what happens in other European countries. Thirteen hectares of land surrounding the lake in the grounds of Áras an Uachtaráin were added in 1997. This made a profound improvement in the amount of space available for the animals.

21st century

In 2002, a twenty eight year old hippo named Linda was thrown a tennis ball by a visitor. While she caught the ball, it became lodged in her intestines and she died soon after. 

In 2005, the Kaziranga Forest Trail was opened. It is now home to eleven Asian elephants; Bernhardine, Yasmin, Asha and Anak, the four mature females. Kavi, Ashoka and Samiya the five-year-old calves, and the newest additions, Zinda, Avani, Kabir and Sanjay.

In 2009, the African Savannah was opened in the African Plains section of the zoo. It is now home to species such as the giraffe, zebra, ostrich, scimitar horned oryx, and southern white rhino.

In 2010, Dublin Zoo received 963,053 visitors. In 2015, Dublin Zoo was the third most popular visitor attraction in Ireland with 1,105,005 visitors.
The year 2015 also saw the death of the well-known and loved silverback western lowland gorilla Harry. During his life at Dublin Zoo, Harry produced many offspring; thus contributing greatly to the conservation of his species.

The documentary TV series The Zoo produced by Moondance Productions is filmed almost entirely on location at Dublin Zoo, and began broadcast on TV3 in 2010, before moving to RTÉ One in Ireland in 2011. It is also broadcast on VRT in Belgium since 2011 and on Discovery Animal Planet in the UK since 2012.

In November 2020 during the COVID-19 pandemic, the public donated over 2 million euro in two days to the zoo to support it. 

In Seanad Éireann in July 2022, Annie Hoey reported allegations from whistleblowers of the mistreatment since 2016 of terminally ill animals, including Harry the gorilla, and of the escape or loss since 2019 of two Celebes crested macaques, a white-collared mangabey, and a citron-crested cockatoo. The zoo said it "vehemently disputes" the allegations.

Conservation
The zoo is part of a worldwide programme to breed endangered species. It is a member of the European Endangered Species Programme (EEP), which helps the conservation of endangered species in Europe. Each species supervised by the EEP has a single coordinator that is responsible for the building of breeding groups with the aim of obtaining a genetically balanced population.

Dublin Zoo manages the EEP for the golden lion tamarin and the Moluccan cockatoo. It also houses members of the species Goeldi's monkey and the white-faced saki which are part of EEPs coordinated by other zoos. The focus is on conservation, which includes breeding and protecting endangered species, as well as research, study and education.

Rodrigues fruit bats
Rodrigues fruit bats are one of Dublin Zoo's endangered species. Fruit bats, as their name suggests, feed on fruit and because of that are very important to the rainforest. Bats cannot digest the seeds and pips of the fruit that they eat and so the seeds leave the bat's digestive system "wrapped" in fertilizer. Without bats, many rain forest trees would not be able to sow their own seeds.

Dublin Zoo has recently completed a larger Asian elephant enclosure (complete with Asian rainforest) and the Nesbit House (bat house) has been demolished. The Rodrigues fruit bats are now in the Roberts House (or bird house), which is located beside the ring-tailed lemurs.

Golden lion tamarins
This tiny monkey, named for the long gold colored hair around its head which resembles a lion's mane, is one of the rarest primates in the world. Golden lion tamarins, like many of the other tamarins found in South America, are threatened with extinction in their natural habitat. Dublin Zoo is involved in the international breeding programme and helps to fund researchers who study the tamarins in Brazil.

The forests that golden lion tamarins need in order to survive are cut down for timber and to make room for cattle ranches, farms and urbanization. Sometimes very small areas or 'pockets' of forest are left but these are too small for the tamarins to survive in. In the past, tamarins were collected for sale to the pet trade or for use in research laboratories. The golden lion tamarins are located in the South American house.

Moluccan cockatoos
Dublin Zoo holds the European studbook for Moluccan cockatoos. A studbook is a record of all the individuals of a particular species that are held in zoos in a region. It contains information such as the sex of the animal, how old it is and who its parents were. This information is then used to decide which birds should be paired with which to get the best genetic mix. This ensures that the captive population stays as genetically healthy as possible. Moluccan cockatoos are handsome birds, white-with-a-hint-of-pink feathers and a pink colour on the crest. This cockatoo is on the endangered species list.

Animals and exhibits
As the result of protests against the standard of animal housing and welfare, led by former keeper Brendan Price, a "Plan for the Future of Dublin Zoo" was prepared by the Zoological Society of Ireland and the Office of Public Works. In 1994 it was presented to Minister of Finance Bertie Ahern. The government granted the zoo IR£15 million (€28 million, adjusted to 2017 inflation levels) for improvements. Themed areas were decided on and the first, World of Primates, opened to the public in 1996. The latest, African Plains, opened in 2001.

African Plains

African Plains is an Africa-themed area that covers 13 hectares and was opened in 2001. The main exhibit in African Plains is the "African Savanna", which houses ostriches, scimitar-horned oryx, southern white rhinoceros, Rothschild's giraffes and Grant's zebras, all of which share a large, outdoor paddock. Gorilla Rainforest, an exhibit opened in 2012, houses a troop of western lowland gorillas: a silverback male named Bangui, two adult females named Kafi and Vana, and two young females named Asali and Kambiri, both of which were born in 2011 and 2019 respectively. Other animals displayed in the African Plains area include chimpanzees, African wild dogs, hippopotamus, sooty mangabeys, African spurred tortoises, Abyssinian ground hornbills, red river hogs, okapis and eastern bongo. The area also features an Africa-themed restaurant (named the Nakuru restaurant) and gift shop. The zoo's last African lion died in 2012, so the zoo later received three Asiatic lions. A baby scimitar-horned oryx was born in December 2016.

Wolves in the Woods
Wolves in the Woods is an exhibition housing grey wolves.

Himalayan Hills
Themed after a Nepalese village, Himalayan Hills houses two species that inhabit the Himalayas, the snow leopard and the Red panda.

Zoorassic World (reptiles)
Dublin Zoo's Reptile House was opened in 1876. In July 2017 Zoorassic World was opened as the new home for the reptiles of the zoo, located in Roberts House. Also included is a T.Rex fossil replica.

Asian Forests

Asian Forests was originally opened in 1998, under the name "World of Cats". It consists of four enclosures, one housing Asiatic lions and designed to resemble the Gir forest in India, the second housing Sulawesi crested macaques designed to look like the rainforests in Sumatra, Indonesia, the third housing Amur tigers designed to resemble the forests of Amur in Russia, China and North Korea and the fourth housing dholes designed to imitate the Indian and South Asian forests.

The Kaziranga Forest Trail

Opened in June 2007. The Kaziranga Forest Trail is Dublin Zoo's Asian elephant enclosure and is named after the Kaziranga National Park in India. The zoo is home to 11 elephants, two adult females named Bernhardine and Yasmin, two younger females named Asha (Bernhardine's daughter) and Anak (Yasmin's daughter) and a bull named Upali. The enclosure features a waterfall and two pools for the elephants, as well as sheltered viewing areas and a children's playground for visitors, and the elephants share their enclosure with a breeding pair of blackbuck. It is also home to two young male elephants named Kavi and Ashoka who were born on 17 July and 19 August 2014 and young female Samiya who was born 17 September 2014. The Kaziranga Forest Trail most recently became home to two female calves, Zinda born 19 September 2016 and Avani born 13 March 2017 and two male calves, Kabir, born 15 May 2017 and Sanjay, born 10 February 2018.

South American House
Dublin Zoo's South American House is sponsored by Kellogg's Coco Pops, and houses various species from Central and South America, including golden lion tamarins, Goeldi's marmosets, Linnaeus's two-toed sloths, squirrel monkeys, military macaws, white-faced sakis, painted wood turtles and pygmy marmosets.

World of Primates
The World of Primates houses contain various species of apes and monkeys. The exhibit opened to the public in 1996. The area comprises a string of man-made islands in a natural lake. The islands range in size from 15 to 30 square metres and are linked by wooden bridges to sleeping quarters on the lake shore.

Some of the islands have climbing frames available for all the animals present in this location. Areas of each island have been sectioned off with hot-wire to facilitate the growth of vegetation and give each island a more natural appearance. On some islands, areas of foraging substrate, such as bark, have been provided to facilitate scatter feeding.

The provision of large viewing windows in the sleeping quarters gives the public access to what is generally an off-show area in many zoos. However, there are areas where the animals can hide from the public in order to receive privacy.

The islands mentioned above are inhabited by siamangs, red ruffed lemurs, ring-tailed lemurs, spider monkeys, and Celebes crested macaques. Each species has unlimited access to their outdoor enclosures both day and night all year round.

The zoo has succeeded in breeding the primates on these islands. The Celebes crested macaque group have done exceptionally well since their introduction to the island, and success has also been achieved with the lemurs and siamangs.

In early 2008, an orangutan escaped her enclosure. She had escaped for an hour and was on top of the Sumatran tiger nighthouse before a group of school children alerted staff. That same year, an orangutan named Jorong was seen rescuing an injured moorhen chick from a pond, "patiently coaxing the bird ashore with a leaf before gently lifting it onto grass"; the rescue became known to the wider public in June 2011, when a four-minute video of the event was posted to YouTube.

Family Farm

Family Farm (formerly known as City Farm) originally opened in 1999, and re-developed in 2010. The area is designed to teach the public about modern Irish farming, and is a joint venture between Dublin Zoo and Agri Aware, a charitable trust that works to improve the image and understanding of Ireland's farming and food industry amongst the general public. Domestic livestock kept in Family Farm include Greyface Dartmoor sheep, Cheviot sheep, pygmy goats, Tamworth pigs named Rose and Ginger, Australorp chickens, call ducks, Indian Runner ducks, Simmental cows, a white rabbit named Roger and a Holstein Friesian cow named Bella.

Sea Lion Cove 
President of Ireland Michael D. Higgins opened the new Sea Lion Cove habitat in June 2015. Sea Lion Cove is home to the colony of California sea lions, three females Cassie, Florence and Seanna and one male Nico. The new saltwater habitat is the biggest and most exciting development undertaken by Dublin Zoo in recent years. It is inspired by the natural environment of the California sea lions and it includes a state of the art water filtration plant.

Other animals
Other animals in Dublin Zoo's collection that are not part of a specific themed area include, Chilean flamingos, meerkats, red pandas, South American tapirs, little egrets and waldrapp ibises.

List of animals

Asian Forests
Asiatic lion
Sulawesi crested macaque
Amur tiger
Dhole

Orangutan Forest
Bornean orangutan
Siamang

Sea Lion Cove
California sea lion
Humboldt penguin

Wolves in the Woods
Grey wolf

Himalayan Hills
Snow leopard
Red panda

African Plains
Hippopotamus
Ostrich
Scimitar-horned oryx
Grant's zebra
Rothschild's giraffe
White rhinoceros
Chimpanzee
White-crowned mangabey
African wild dog
Abyssinian ground hornbill
African spurred tortoise
Red river hog
Western lowland gorilla
Red-capped mangabey
Eastern bongo
Okapi

Kaziranga Forest Trail
Asian elephant
Blackbuck

South American House
Linnaeus's two-toed sloth
Golden lion tamarin
Pygmy marmoset
Black-capped squirrel monkey
White-faced saki
Red-footed tortoise
Scarlet macaw

Family Farm
African pygmy goat
Australorp bantam chicken
Holstein Friesian cattle
Sheep
Tamworth pig
Landrace pig
Rabbit

Zoorassic World (reptiles)
African spurred tortoise
Annam leaf turtle
Burmese python
Chinese stripe-necked turtle
Green crested lizard
Green tree python
Indian star tortoise
King ratsnake
Mangrove monitor
Panther chameleon
West African crocodile

Other
Red ruffed lemur
South American tapir
Meerkat
Indian peafowl
Red panda
Chilean flamingo
Waldrapp ibis
Ring-tailed lemur
Citron-crested cockatoo
Mallard duck
Tufted duck

See also

 Natural History Museum (Ireland)
 King Edward VII

References

External links

Skin of a Persian lioness, belonging to an endangered subspecies of lions, brought to Dublin by King Edward VII in 1902 (during the reign of Shah Mozaffar ad-Din in Persia).

Zoos in the Republic of Ireland
Zoo
Decimus Burton buildings
Zoos established in 1830
Phoenix Park
1830 establishments in Ireland